The 1988 United States presidential election in South Carolina took place on November 8, 1988. All 50 states and the District of Columbia, were part of the 1988 United States presidential election. South Carolina voters chose eight electors to the Electoral College, which selected the president and vice president.

South Carolina was won by incumbent United States Vice President George H. W. Bush of Texas, who was running against Massachusetts Governor Michael Dukakis. Bush ran with Indiana Senator Dan Quayle as Vice President, and Dukakis ran with Texas Senator Lloyd Bentsen.

South Carolina weighed in for this election as 16% more Republican than the national average, and was the fourth most Republican state in the nation behind Utah, New Hampshire and Idaho.

The presidential election of 1988 was a very partisan election for South Carolina, with more than 99% of the electorate voting for either the Democratic or Republican parties, and only 4 candidates appearing on the ballot. As can be seen in several states across the country during this election, the large population centers in South Carolina voted Republican, but several counties near-by the large population centers voted Democratic, suggesting the influence of suburban populations. This effect can be seen with the city of Columbia in Richland County, which voted Republican, while its less-populated neighbor, Fairfield County, voted Democratic. This geographic trend is opposite of what you would expect to see with these parties, and once again may suggest an element of influence from (for example) the city of Columbia's suburban districts.

, this is the last election in which Richland County voted for a Republican Presidential candidate. Bush won the election in South Carolina by a landslide 23.9% margin. Bush scored particularly strong wins in the population centers of Greenville and Lexington Counties, winning over 70% of the vote in both. He also powerfully won Spartanburg County, the largest county in the state that had remained a Democratic stronghold into the 1960s and 1970s, with over 60% of the vote.

Results

Results by county

See also
 Presidency of George H. W. Bush

References

South Carolina
1988
1988 South Carolina elections